Salaak is a fictional comic book superhero, an extraterrestrial from the planet Slyggia, and a member of the intergalactic police force known as the Green Lantern Corps, who appears in DC Comics. Physically, he has pinkish orange skin and four arms.

Publication history
Salaak first appears in Green Lantern #149 and was created by Marv Wolfman and Joe Staton.

Fictional character biography
A famous pessimist and loner, Salaak is a creature of protocol and laws. A veteran Green Lantern, he has served in many Corps campaigns over the years. During the Crisis on Infinite Earths he protects multiple sectors, but found the experience depressing. After this, he went to Earth looking for company amongst his fellow Green Lanterns. He served with the contingent of Green Lanterns assigned to Earth and became good friends with Ch'p of H'lven. For a time Salaak lived in the future, filling the identity of Pol Manning as Hal Jordan had before him. While in the future, Salaak was married to a human woman.

Salaak returns to the present day to warn about the destruction of the Corps. He was too late to stop the execution of Sinestro. The Central Power Battery on Oa ends up destroyed, and with it, Salaak's ring is made inoperable. He finds transport to H'lven where he reunites with Ch'p, one of the few Lanterns whose ring still functioned. Salaak remains on H'lven and acts as Ch'p's advisor until they discover that the Guardians have returned and have rebuilt the Corps. The two later petition for reinstatement, but Ch'p is killed in a traffic accident. The Corps is destroyed again when Hal Jordan, crazed with grief at the loss of friends, became the entity known as Parallax. Hal's activities caused the shutdown of the Oan battery again and Salaak, along with all other Green Lanterns, were left powerless.

Salaak ends up captured, along with multiple other Green Lanterns and one Darkstar. They are scheduled to be sold into slavery but former Green Lantern Guy Gardner, with powers underived from a Power Ring, rescues the entire group.

Promotion
Salaak attends Hal's memorial service on Earth. The Corps, reformed again, has Salaak as the senior administrator and the Keeper of the Book of Oa. The Book tells of the adventures of multiple Green Lanterns throughout the history of the universe.

Salaak reinforces the squadron of Lanterns sent to save Mogo from Ranx the Sentient City and other Sinestro Corps members (Sinestro having returned from the dead). He has expressed displeasure at the fact that the Guardians have rewritten the Book of Oa to allow lethal force against members of the Sinestro Corps, but is still committed to serve.

He survived the Sinestro Corps War without major injuries, and he continues to hold on to his position as keeper of the Book of Oa. He is kept out of the loop in some instances by the Guardians who neglected to tell him their plans to create the Alpha Lanterns. He is seen getting into an argument with Guy Gardner over a bar he wishes to open. Salaak quickly disapproves, which leads Guy to use his ring to make a miniaturized version of Salaak mocking him for "hanging out with midgets".

Salaak is seen in Final Crisis #5 as part of the trial of Hal Jordan.

During the Blackest Night, Oa comes under siege from the Black Lantern Corps. With the Guardians missing, Salaak takes command of the Green Lantern Corps as Clarissi and thus the next in succession after the Guardians, preventing the Alpha Lanterns' attempt to take control. As his first command decision, Salaak decrees that all fallen Lantern rings be sent to Mogo, so as not to endanger any new recruits.

After the War of the Green Lanterns, Salaak went along with the Guardians' orders to prepare a space for Krona in the Green Lantern memorial hall despite the other Corps members' anger at such a decision, despite Salaak claiming that the Guardians want to remember the good that Krona did in helping to found the Corps rather than the evil he committed later, with the other Corps members denouncing him for his blind loyalty.

When Kyle Rayner is briefly turned into a ring magnet, Salaak attempts to remove Kyle's Green Lantern ring on the Guardians' orders. Kyle's ring resists Salaak's attempt at removal as Kyle protests the decision and what they did to Ganthet. Later, Salaak assigns the Green Lantern B'dg to find Hal Jordan on Earth and discovers that the green rings are being delayed under the authorization of the Guardians to which he also secretly informs Kilowog of these events. Concerned at recent events, Salaak begins to spy on the Guardians, learning of their plans for the Third Army. He is subsequently caught and locked away despite his protests that their plans are wrong. After the unemotional Guardians are killed off by Sinestro, Salaak is freed from his imprisonment by Kilowog and Guy Gardner, who explain to him the events regarding the villainous First Lantern. Later, Salaak helps Guy search for his old arch-enemy, Xar. Guy slays Xar on Earth.

As with most Lanterns, Salaak is lost in the dying universe proceeding this one. He is fortunate to be one of the few Lanterns on the thriving, living Lantern world Mogo, which has become a center of activity in what is left of said universe.

The Corps have returned, damaged and with many casualties, to their proper place and time. Salaak has returned to active duty, such as assisting against the brainwashing menace Starro.

Other versions
 Salaak, along with the Green Lanterns Brik and Ash perished in a Green Lantern crossover with the Dark Horse comic Aliens. As inter-company crossovers are not considered canonical, this was ignored.
 Salaak appears in LICD web comic.
 In an alternate universe ruled by evil versions of the Planetary heroes, Salaak is one of the many dead Green Lanterns on display in the Planetary headquarters.

In other media

Television
 Salaak makes a cameo appearance in the Superman: The Animated Series episode "In Brightest Day...".
 Salaak makes a non-speaking appearance in the Justice League Unlimited episode "The Return", among several other Lanterns, who sought to destroy Amazo for seemingly destroying Oa.
 Salaak appears in the Duck Dodgers episode "The Green Loontern".
 Salaak makes non-speaking cameo appearances in Batman: The Brave and the Bold.
 He also appears in Green Lantern: The Animated Series, voiced by Tom Kenny. He grew angry, along with Hal Jordan and Kilowog, when they found out that the Guardians had kept the other frontier Lantern deaths from the Corps. He later defends the Guardians when Atrocitus and Zilius Zox infiltrate Oa. He is able to deflect Zox's attack but is defeated when Atrocitus attacks him from behind. With what strength he had left, he opened the Guardians' chamber dome to allow Hal in to defeat Atrocitus. In the season finale, Salaak is seen coordinating the Corps against the Aya Monitor.

Film

Live action
Salaak makes a cameo appearance in the live-action Green Lantern film.

Animation
 Salaak appears as a background character in Green Lantern: First Flight.
 Salaak appears in Green Lantern: Emerald Knights, voiced by Peter Jessop.
 Salaak makes a brief appearance in Justice League vs. the Fatal Five, voiced again by Tom Kenny.
 Salaak makes a cameo appearance in Justice League Dark: Apokolips War. He is seen fighting against Darkseid's forces but is killed in battle along with the other Lanterns.

Miscellaneous
Salaak is featured in the Smallville Season 11 digital comic based on the TV series.

References

External links
 The Book of OA
 The Green Lantern Shrine
 The Captains Log

Comics characters introduced in 1982
DC Comics superheroes
DC Comics aliens
DC Comics extraterrestrial superheroes
Characters created by Marv Wolfman
Green Lantern Corps officers